Leônidas Francisco Marques da Silva (5 April 1914 – 18 April 1996) was an Olympic freestyle swimmer from Brazil, who participated at one Summer Olympics for his native country. At the 1936 Summer Olympics in Berlin, he swam the 100-metre and the 4×200-metre freestyle, not reaching the finals.

References

External links 
 
 

1914 births
1996 deaths
Swimmers at the 1936 Summer Olympics
Olympic swimmers of Brazil
Brazilian male freestyle swimmers
20th-century Brazilian people